Wayford Manor House is a country house with a garden in Britain, situated in Wayford, Somerset, England. It has been designated a Grade I listed building.

House
The house includes a central range which was rebuilt about 1600 on the site of an earlier building by Charles Daubeney, probably with William Arnold as master mason.

The north wing was completed in 1900 by architect Sir Ernest George.

Garden
Work on the gardens, including terraces and archways was carried out by Harold Peto around 1902. Peto was the brother of the wife of Lawrence Ingham Baker when he bought the house. The current Arts and Crafts garden is partly built on the site of an earlier Elizabethan garden. It includes a Japanese garden and a collection of mature trees, along with a rock garden, orchard and shrubs. The garden is listed Grade II on the Register of Historic Parks and Gardens of special historic interest in England.

Wayford Woods, close to the house, has an ornamental lake and is known for its large number of fairy doors.

See also
List of Grade I listed buildings in South Somerset

References

Further reading
 R. Whalley, The Great Edwardian Gardens of Harold Peto (2007)

Arts and Crafts gardens
Ernest George buildings
Harold Peto buildings
Gardens by Harold Peto
Grade I listed buildings in South Somerset
Grade I listed houses in Somerset
Grade II listed parks and gardens in Somerset